Cnaphalocrocis didialis is a species of moth of the family Crambidae. 
It can be found in Madagascar .

Its wingspan is 19mm, with a length of the forewings of 9mm.

The holotype had been collected in 1954 near Périnet (Analamazoatra Reserve)

References 

Spilomelinae
Moths of Madagascar
Moths of Africa
Moths described in 1958